The Mail & Guardian is a South African weekly newspaper and website, published by M&G Media in Johannesburg, South Africa. It focuses on political analysis, investigative reporting, Southern African news, local arts, music and popular culture. It is considered a newspaper of record for South Africa.

History
The publication began as the Weekly Mail, an alternative newspaper by a group of journalists in 1985 after the closure of two leading liberal newspapers, The Rand Daily Mail and Sunday Express. Weekly Mail was one of the first newspapers to use Apple Mac desktop publishing.

The Weekly Mail criticised the government and its apartheid policies, which led to the banning of the paper in 1988 by then State President P. W. Botha. The paper was renamed the Weekly Mail & Guardian from 30 July 1993. The London-based Guardian Media Group (GMG), the publisher of The Guardian, became the majority shareholder of the print edition in 1995, and the name was changed to Mail & Guardian.

In 2002, 87.5% of the company was sold to the Newtrust Company Botswana Limited, which was owned by Trevor Ncube, a Zimbabwean publisher and entrepreneur. Ncube took over as the CEO of the company.

In 2006 MD Africa became the Mail & Guardians national distributor. The change resulted in good circulation growth, despite difficult market conditions. In 2013 the newspaper achieved a record period with 51,551 copies circulated. MDA distributed a number of publications including Noseweek and Destiny magazine.

In 2017, Media Development Investment Fund, a New York-based not-for-profit investment fund, announced that it had acquired a majority stake in the Mail & Guardian. The restructured ownership saw the CEO, Hoosain Karjieker, acquire a minority stake in the business as part of a Black Economic Empowerment (BEE) transaction. Staff continue to own a 10% share of the company. The former majority shareholder, Trevor Ncube, disposed of his equity interest.

The newspaper's headquarters are in Johannesburg. The editor-in-chief is Ron Derby and the CEO is Hoosain Karjieker.

The Mail & Guardian is considered a newspaper of record for South Africa.

The Mail & Guardian Online
In 1994, the Mail & Guardian Online was launched in conjunction with Media24 (a subsidiary of the Naspers group), becoming the first internet news publication in Africa. It has grown into its own daily news operation with a number of writers, multimedia producers, sub-editors and more. It is run out of the Mail & Guardian offices in Rosebank, Johannesburg. The site focuses on local, international and African hard news, sport and business.

The website began its life as the Electronic Mail & Guardian''', which was initially an e-mail subscription service that allowed readers living outside South Africa to receive Mail & Guardian newspaper stories before they reached newspaper subscribers. Soon after, the service expanded into a searchable online archive, published in partnership with Sangonet, the country's oldest internet service provider. A website was added, which in turn progressed from producing a weekly mirror of the printed newspaper to generating its own daily news.

The Mail & Guardian Online was jointly owned by internet service provider MWEB and publishing company M&G Media until M&G Media purchased 100% of the operation in 2008.

It has interactive news photo galleries, discussion forums and special reports on subjects such as Zimbabwe, HIV and South African President Jacob Zuma. It is known for hard-hitting political reporting, investigations as well as strong beat reporting, particularly in education, labour, environment and health.

Awards
 2012: CNN African Journalism award (2012)
 2012: Standard Bank Sikuvile Journalism Award
 2011: Vodacom Journalist of the Year
 2011: Bookmark awards
 2010: Bookmark awards
 2008: Webby Awards Honoree for News in Photos and Political Blog
 2005: Webby Awards Honoree for Web Best Practices
 2001: Forbes.com voted the Mail & Guardian Online'' one of the world's top 175 websites
 1996: Missouri Honor Medal for Distinguished Journalism
 1995: International Press Directory - Best International Newspaper

Distribution figures

See also
 List of newspapers in South Africa
 Mail & Guardian 200 Young South Africans

References

External links
 Mail & Guardian Online
 SAARF Website
 Voices of Africa

1985 establishments in South Africa
Publications established in 1985
South African news websites
Weekly newspapers published in South Africa
Organisations associated with apartheid
Mass media in Johannesburg
Online newspapers published in South Africa